Sydney to the Max is an American comedy television series created by Mark Reisman that aired on Disney Channel from January 25, 2019 to November 26, 2021. The series stars Ruth Righi, Ava Kolker, Jackson Dollinger, Christian J. Simon, Ian Reed Kesler, and Caroline Rhea.

Premise 
Sydney Reynolds is a 12-year-old girl who lives in Portland, Oregon with her father Max and her paternal grandmother Judy as she navigates life in middle school with her best friend Olive. Each half-hour episode includes a flashback segment set in 1992 that details 12-year-old Max and his friend Leo, who both work at a shopping mall arcade owned by Leo's father. Both segments show Sydney and young Max getting into similar situations.

Episodes

Cast and characters

Main 
 Ruth Righi as Sydney Reynolds, a sociable middle school student; her middle name is revealed to be Wallace in "As Bad as She Gets"
 Ava Kolker as Olive, Sydney's best friend who has four brothers; her last name is revealed to be Rozalski in "Good Grade Hunting"; her middle name is revealed to be Anne in "As Bad as She Gets"
 Jackson Dollinger as Young Max Reynolds, who lives with his mother Judy; his full name is revealed to be Maxwell Keith Reynolds in "As Bad as She Gets"
 Christian J. Simon as Leo, the childhood friend of Max who is seen in his flashbacks; his last name is revealed to be Webb in "The Lyin' King"; his full name is revealed to be Leonard Lawrence Webb in "As Bad as She Gets". Leo is Alisha's cousin, and thus the future first cousin once removed of Sydney.
 Ian Reed Kesler as Adult Max Reynolds, the protective father of Sydney and proprietor of the bike shop, Reynolds Rides, who has raised Sydney since his wife, Alisha, died 5 years prior to the series' 2019 events; at certain moments, he has flashbacks to his middle school days; his full name is revealed to be Maxwell Keith Reynolds in "As Bad as She Gets"
 Caroline Rhea as Judy, Sydney's spiritual grandmother and Max's mother who helps Max to raise Sydney; in flashbacks, she watches over Max while his father Doug is away working as a pilot in another city with an unpredictable work schedule

Recurring 
 Rizwan Manji as Vice Principal Virmani, the vice-principal of Clara Barton Middle School who has been vice-principal since Max's childhood
 Julia Garcia as Emmy, Sydney and Olive's prideful classmate and friend; her last name is revealed to be Mendoza in "Rock the Float"
 Amelia Wray as Sophia, Sydney and Olive's classmate and friend
 Brogan Hall as Bucky, a classmate and a friend of young Max and Leo
 Cassidey Fralin as Young Alisha, cousin of Leo, future wife of Max, and future mother of Sydney; her adult self dies five years prior to the series' 2019 start

Notable guest stars
 Eric Allan Kramer as Coach Carlock, the fencing coach at Clara Barton Middle School
 Reginald VelJohnson as Principal Linkenberry, the principal at Clara Barton Middle School

Production 
The multi-camera series was green-lit by Disney Channel on September 6, 2018, and slated to premiere in early 2019. The series was created by Mark Reisman, who also serves as showrunner, executive producer, and writer. Starring in the series are Ruth Righi as Sydney Reynolds, Ian Reed Kesler as Max, Christian J. Simon as Leo, Ava Kolker as Olive, Caroline Rhea as Judy, and newcomer Jackson Dollinger as Young Max. The series is produced by It's a Laugh Productions. On November 19, 2018, it was announced that the series would premiere on January 25, 2019. The theme song is produced and written by Kay Hanley, Michelle Lewis, and Dan Petty and performed by Ruth Righi and Dan Conklin. On January 16, 2019, Disney Channel released the official opening sequence. On May 23, 2019, it was announced that Disney Channel renewed the series for a second season. On November 21, 2019, it was announced that Disney Channel renewed the series for a third season, ahead of its second season premiere. On April 1, 2022, it was reported that the series concluded production after the third season, with the final episode airing on November 26, 2021.

Ratings 
 

| link2             = List of Sydney to the Max episodes#Season 2 (2019–20)
| episodes2         = 21
| start2            = 
| end2              = 
| startrating2      = 0.40
| endrating2        = 0.36
| viewers2          = |2}} 

| link3             = List of Sydney to the Max episodes#Season 3 (2021)
| episodes3         = 21
| start3            = 
| end3              = 
| startrating3      = 0.36
| endrating3        = 0.33
| viewers3          = |2}} 
}}

References

External links 
 
 

2010s American children's comedy television series
2020s American children's comedy television series
2019 American television series debuts
2021 American television series endings
Disney Channel original programming
English-language television shows
Television series by It's a Laugh Productions
Television shows set in Portland, Oregon